The Exile Tour is the second concert tour by British band Hurts in support of their second album Exile. On 11 December 2012, Theo Hutchcraft posted an image on Twitter which announced the first 14 dates of the tour. Autumn 2013 dates were published by Hutchcraft on Twitter on 26 August 2013. The tour started on 5 October in Ukraine and will end on 22 November in Luxembourg, with 21 dates in total. In February and March 2014 Hurts took a part in Art on Ice Tour. Hurts was accompanied by the Youth Classics orchestra at the six shows in Zurich in February and March.

Background 

At the beginning of the show, Hutchcraft appears on the scene wearing a hooded parka and leather gloves. He takes the parka off after the first song. As in the previous Happiness Tour, he throws white roses into the crowd. During "The Road", he breaks the microphone stand. Adam Anderson performs most of the songs while sitting at the synthesizer, but during "Exile", "Miracle", "Evelyn", and "The Road", "Mercy", "Help", "Cupid" and acoustic version of "Blood Tears & Gold" he stands up and plays the guitar. For the encore, they perform their song "Stay" at the first leg of tour. The light design team has a trailer with scenery and 20,000 lights for each show. Unlike the previous tour, where dramatically dressed dancers followed the duo on stage, this tour focuses on the performance itself. Dancers appeared on stage at the most of the many summer festivals since Rock im Park in Germany on 7 June.

On 25 October Hurts get new stage lighting equipment.

Hurts used red and white confetti at the end of the song called "Help" at their show at Troxy in London, 26 October 2013.

Instruments for performances: synthesizers; guitars "Manson", "Gretsch", "Fender Telecaster", "Fender Stratocaster", "Fender Precision Bass", effects unit "TC Electronic", "Mesa Boogie"; drums "Sonor", "Paiste"; saxophone, clarinet, viola, violins, cello.

Reception 
Reviewers unanimously admit there is more drama in the new shows, agreeing that the emotional connection between the band and the crowd is stronger than ever.

Opening acts 
Say Lou Lou (select dates in February, March, November 2013)
Uniqplan (Warsaw, 20 March 2013)
Make My Heart Explode (Prague, 28 March 2013)
 Bahroma (Kyiv, 5 October 2013)
 Pawws (UK, 25–26 October 2013)
 Golden Parazyth (Tallinn, 3 November 2013; Riga, 4 November 2013; Vilnius, 6 November 2013)
 XXANAXX (Warsaw, 7 November 2013)
 LUNO (Prague, 8 November 2013)
Glasvegas (Germany, 10–15 November 2013)
Pegasus (Germany, 10–15 November 2013; Bern, 18 November 2013; Brussels 20 November 2013; Utrecht, 21 November 2013)

Setlist 
The tour's setlist generally consists of half of the songs from Happiness and half from Exile.

Tour dates 

Notes
The show in Amsterdam was originally scheduled at the Old Hall, but it was moved to The Max.
This performance is a part of Art on Ice Tour.

Cancelled dates

Personnel 

Main
 Matt Vines, Neil Reeves – management/tour management
 Rick Smith – production management
 Rob Sinclair - lighting and stage design
 Matt Arthur – lighting director
 Chris Freeman – backline
 Lee Birchall – backline
 Adam Pendse – FOH engineer
 Paul Roberts – choreographer
 Caroline Royce, Emily Rumbles – dancers

Source:

Band

Hurts
 Theo Hutchcraft – vocals
 Adam Anderson – keyboards, guitar

Musicians
 Lael Goldberg – bass, backing vocals
 Pete Watson – keyboards, piano, backing vocals
 Paul Walsham – drums
 Amy May – saxophone, clarinet, viola, backing vocals
 Paloma Deike, Penny Anscow – violin, backing vocals
 Rhian Porter – cello

References 

2013 concert tours
2014 concert tours